George W. Bellamy (1867–1920) was the first lieutenant governor of Oklahoma, from 1907 until 1911 alongside Oklahoma's first governor, Charles N. Haskell.

Early life
Bellamy was born in Missouri in December 1867. He married Lou Blanche Jones in Stillwater, Oklahoma on December 5, 1894. They had a daughter named Constance, before Lou's death in 1900. Bellamy worked as a pharmacist.

Political career
A member of the Democratic Party, Bellamy was elected as Lieutenant Governor of Oklahoma in 1907, beating Republican N. G. Turk with 132,568 (54.7%) to 100,106 votes (41.31%), and served until 1911 alongside Governor Charles Haskell. He was the first in a long line of Democratic Lieutenant Governors, lasting until 1995.

References

External links

Lieutenant Governors of Oklahoma
Oklahoma Democrats
1867 births
1920 deaths